Como dos gotas de agua is a 1963 Spanish musical comedy film directed by Luis César Amadori, scored by Gregorio García Segura and starring Pili and Mili.

Cast

References

External links
 

Films directed by Luis César Amadori
Films scored by Gregorio García Segura
Spanish musical comedy films
1960s musical comedy films
Films shot in Madrid
Columbia Pictures films
1964 comedy films
1964 films
1960s Spanish films